Wildwood is a unincorporated community and census-designated place (CDP) located in the northeastern corner of Dade County, Georgia, United States. It was first listed as a CDP in the 2020 census with a population of 382.

Description
The community is close to the Tennessee state line and the Chattanooga city limits, and is considered part of the Chattanooga metropolitan area. It sits in the diagonal valley between Sand Mountain and Lookout Mountain, which runs through all of Dade County and is home to most of its population. According to the 2000 Census, the 30757 Zip Code Tabulation Area had a population of 1,923---accounting for approximately 12% of Dade County's population of 16,040.                                   The noted Southern humorist George Washington Harris (1814–1869) is buried in the Brock Cemetery in Wildwood, GA. Although he was considered one of the seminal writers of Southern humor and greatly influenced the literary works of Mark Twain, William Faulkner, and Flannery O'Connor, his grave was not officially identified and marked with a monument until 2008. Across the street from Brock Cemetery in Wildwood is Belvedere Plantation c. 1835, the oldest of the few remaining antebellum homes in the metro-Chattanooga area.

The northern terminus of Interstate 59 with Interstate 24 is found in the community.

Demographics

2020 census

Note: the US Census treats Hispanic/Latino as an ethnic category. This table excludes Latinos from the racial categories and assigns them to a separate category. Hispanics/Latinos can be of any race.

See also

References

External links

Chattanooga metropolitan area
Census-designated places in Dade County, Georgia
Unincorporated communities in Dade County, Georgia
U.S. Route 11